Juan Carlos Howard (12 October 1912 - 2 November 1986) was an Argentine tango pianist, bandleader and composer.

Early life 
Juan Carlos was born in the San Isidro Partido of Buenos Aires to parents Juan and Lidia Cerradi. They encouraged him to play the piano and he made his radio debut at the age of 12.

Career 
Juan Carlos Howard played with many bands including those of Juan d'Arienzo, Roberto Zerrillo, Francisco Lomuto and Héctor Varela. He also led his own band on more than one occasion.

He composed many tangos including the popular hits "Y te parece todavía" and "Melodía oriental".

External links
Juan Carlos Howard at tango.info

References 

1912 births
1986 deaths
People from San Isidro, Buenos Aires
Argentine tango musicians
Burials at La Chacarita Cemetery